Richard Burgess (1796–1881) was an English archaeologist and biblical scholar.

References

1796 births
1881 deaths
British biblical scholars
English archaeologists